Riccardo Milani (born 15 April 1958) is an Italian film and television director and screenwriter.

Life and career 
Born in Rome, Milani began his career in 1985, as assistant director of Mario Monicelli in Let's Hope It's a Girl.

After being assistant of Nanni Moretti, Florestano Vancini and Daniele Luchetti, in 1994 he made his feature film debut  with the comedy-drama Auguri professore. In 2001 he made his television debut, directing the miniseries Il sequestro Soffiantini. He is married to actress Paola Cortellesi. He's an atheist but he admires Christian values.

Filmography

Film 
 Auguri professore (1994)
 The Anto War (1999)
 The Soul's Place (2003)
 Piano, solo (2007)
 Welcome Mr. President (2013)
 Do You See Me? (2014)
 Mom or Dad? (2017)
 Like a Cat on a Highway (2017)
 Don't Stop Me Now (2019)
 Like a Cat on a Highway 2 (2021)
 Corro da te (2022)

Television 
 Tutti pazzi per amore (TV, 2008–2010)
 Atelier Fontana - Le sorelle della moda (TV, 2011)

References

External links 
 

1958 births
Italian film directors
Italian television directors
Italian screenwriters
Italian male screenwriters
Writers from Rome
Living people
Italian atheists